Elections for the third Knesset were held in Israel on 26 July 1955. Voter turnout was 82.8%.

Parliament factions

The table below lists the parliamentary factions represented in the 2nd Knesset.

Results
Mapai retained its plurality in the Knesset, although its share of the vote dropped by 5.1 and its share of seats dropped from 47 (at the end of the Second Knesset) to 40. Meanwhile, Herut overtook the General Zionists, Mapam, and Hapoel HaMizrachi to become the second-largest party, with its share of seats nearly doubling (from 8 in the Second Knesset to 15 in the Third).

The Third Knesset is notable for being the only Knesset thus far in which none of the represented parties merged or split (although two parties did change their names) and no MKs switched parties, making it the most stable Knesset in Israel's history.

Aftermath

Unlike the second Knesset, the third Knesset was one of the most stable in Israel's history. There were only two governments, and it was the only Knesset to date during which none of the parties split or merged. As with the first and second Knesset, the speaker was Yosef Sprinzak until his death on 28 January 1959. He was replaced by Ahdut HaAvoda's Nahum Nir.

Seventh government

The third Knesset started with David Ben-Gurion forming the seventh government of Israel (the previous two Knessets had six governments; two in the first and four in the second) on 3 November 1955. His Mapai party formed a coalition with the National Religious Front (which later changed its name to the National Religious Party), Mapam, the Progressive Party, Ahdut HaAvoda, and the three Israeli Arab parties, the Democratic List for Israeli Arabs, Progress and Work, Agriculture and Development. The government had 16 ministers. It collapsed when Ben-Gurion resigned on 31 December 1957 over the leaking of information from ministerial meetings.

Eighth government

Ben-Gurion formed the eighth government a week later on 7 January 1958 with the same coalition partners. The number of ministers remained the same. The eighth government collapsed when Ben-Gurion resigned again on 5 July 1959 after Labour Unity and Mapam had voted against the government on the issue of selling arms to West Germany and refused to leave the coalition. Elections for the fourth Knesset were called for 3 November 1959.

References

External links
Historical overview of the Third Knesset Knesset website
Election results Knesset website

1955 elections in Israel
Legislative election
Legislative elections in Israel
July 1955 events in Asia
Israel